Vučinović, Vucinovic is a Serbo-Croatian surname. Notable people with the surname include:

 Marc Vucinovic (born 1988), German footballer
 Marija Vučinović (born 1958), Croatian politician

See also
 Vacenovice, village in the Czech Republic
 Vučenović, surname

Serbo-Croatian-language surnames